Termessa discrepans is a moth in the subfamily Arctiinae. It was described by Francis Walker in 1865. It is found in Australia, where it has been recorded from the Australian Capital Territory, New South Wales, Queensland and Victoria.

References

Moths described in 1865
Lithosiini